Yahya Hamoudeh (‎; 1908 – 16 June 2006) was the Chairman of the Palestine Liberation Organization (PLO) Executive Committee from 24 December 1967 to 2 February 1969, following the resignation of Ahmad Shukeiri.  He was succeeded by Yasser Arafat.

Hamoudeh was born in the village of Lifta in 1908. A founding member of the General Refugee Congress (GRC). The first congress of the GRC occurred on 17 March 1949 in Ramallah where Muhammad Nimr al-Hawari was elected as President with Yahya Hamuda as deputy. The Palestine Conciliation Commission (PCC) hoping to gain a degree of independent Palestinian representation, invited GRC delegates to come and appear before the PCC.

Footnotes

External links
PLO Timeline in Arabic.

Palestine Liberation Organization members
People from Jerusalem
Palestinian refugees
Palestinian politicians
1908 births
2006 deaths